Dr Girish Bihari (5 March 1938 – 29 April 2009) was an Indian educationist and Indian Police Service (IPS) officer. He joined the IPS in 1961, and held the post of Director General of Police in the state of Uttar Pradesh during the period 12 August 1995 – 31 March 1996. He retired from the IPS in March 1996 and left for heavenly abode on 29 April 2009.

Academics
Ph.D.; M.Sc.; LL.B.; Prof. in French, Russian, German, Spanish, Diplomas in Journalism, Computer, Yoga (B.H.U.), Management, Police Community Relations.

Member: International Police Association, Research Degree Committee, Ph.D. Examiner, Indian Society of Criminology, Indian Council of World Affairs, Indian Institute of Defence Studies, Authors Guild of India. Former Principal Police Training College; Guest Lecturer Internal Security Academy, B.S.F. Academy, National Police Academy

Bibliography
 Civil insurgency and intelligence operations (1982) New Delhi : Lancers Publishers
 Gitanjali of Rabindra Nath Tagore — As I saw It and Understood It (2006) Lucknow: Film Institute
 Kamayani of Jai Shankar Prasad — As I saw It and Understood It (2006) Lucknow: Film Institute

Awards
 President's Police Medal for Meritorious Services
 `Man of the Year’ Award presented by the Governor of Uttar Pradesh on behalf of National Institute for Personnel Management

References

External links
 https://web.archive.org/web/20110728144611/http://www.upsam.upeace.org/pdf/Curricula/Nath/Final%20Development%20CD%20for%20Submission.pdf
 http://archives.digitaltoday.in/indiatoday/20060821/web.html
 https://web.archive.org/web/20090929111653/http://www.econ.mq.edu.au/Econ_docs/cjes/2008_1_Tandon_Globalization_online.pdf
 Role of police in a changing society By Aparna Srivastava

1938 births
2009 deaths
Indian police officers
People from Faizabad